Bonjour Monsieur Shlomi (Hebrew title:  Ha-Kochavim Shel Shlomi, Shlomi's Stars) is a 2003 film written and directed by Shemi Zarhin.

The story is about a 16-year-old Israeli boy, named Shlomi. Who cares for everyone in his life but himself.

Shlomi lives with his jealous and pretentious mother, his soldier brother, and their elderly grandfather. Although not doing well in school, Shlomi is a gifted cook and takes care of most household chores, while all the grownups around him are busy with their childish affairs, neglect him, and ignore his dyslexia.

Shlomi tries to be invisible, especially at school, until a routine math test catches the attention of Shlomi's teacher, who suspects that a unique gift lies behind that dormant facade. The school's headmaster takes Shlomi under his wing, and Shlomi blossoms.

Main cast
Oshri Cohen – Shlomi Bar-Dayan
Arieh Elias – Grandfather Bar-Dayan
Esti Zakheim – Ruhama Bar-Dayan, the mother
Aya Koren – Rona
Yigal Naor – Avihu, the headmaster
 – Robert Bar-Dayan, the father and Ruhama's Ex-husband
 – Doron Bar-Dayan, the brother
Rotem Abuhab – Ziva, the sister
Asi Cohen – Tzachi, the brother-in-law and Ziva's husband

Soundtrack
Original Score - Jonathan Bar Giora
Theme song - Od Avo Music:Jonathan Bar Giora lyrics: Nathan Alterman Performed by Chaim Uliel

References

External links

 Original Soundtrack

2003 films
2003 comedy-drama films
2000s Hebrew-language films
Israeli comedy-drama films